John Johnston Parker (November 20, 1885 – March 17, 1958) was an American politician and United States circuit judge of the United States Court of Appeals for the Fourth Circuit. He was an unsuccessful nominee for associate justice of the United States Supreme Court in 1930. He was also the United States alternate judge at the Nuremberg trials of accused Nazi war criminals and later served on the United Nations' International Law Commission.

Early and family life

Born on November 20, 1885, in Monroe, North Carolina, Parker was the oldest of four children born to Frances Ann (Johnston) and John Daniel Parker. He was a descendent of William Bradford, a founder of Plymouth Colony, in Massachusetts, and of associate justice of the Supreme Court of the United States James Iredell. He was also a brother of Samuel I. Parker, first recipient of the army's three highest decorations for valor.

Parker received a Bachelor of Arts degree in 1907 from the University of North Carolina at Chapel Hill, where he was elected to membership in Phi Beta Kappa and was class president. He received a Bachelor of Laws in 1908 from the University of North Carolina School of Law. Following a legal apprenticeship in Greensboro, North Carolina, he practiced law in Monroe from 1909 to 1922, and then in Charlotte, North Carolina until 1925.

On November 23, 1910, he married Maria Burgwin Maffitt. They had three children: Sara Burgwin, John Jr., and Francis Iredell.

Parker ran unsuccessfully for political office on three occasions as a Republican. In 1910, he was a candidate for the United States House of Representatives from North Carolina's 10th congressional district. In 1916, he was a candidate for Attorney General of North Carolina. Then, in 1920, he was a candidate for Governor of North Carolina.

From 1923 to 1924 Parker served as a special assistant to the Attorney General of the United States. He was tasked with prosecution of former Wilson Administration officials for alleged frauds associated with World War I demobilization. His efforts resulted in no indictments of convictions. None the less, he made favorable impressions upon Justice Department colleagues, including then Attorney General and future Supreme Court Justice Harlan F. Stone.

Federal judicial service

Parker received a recess appointment from President Calvin Coolidge on October 3, 1925, to a seat on the United States Court of Appeals for the Fourth Circuit vacated by Judge Charles Albert Woods. He was nominated to the same position by President Coolidge on December 8, 1925. He was confirmed by the United States Senate on December 14, 1925, and received his commission the same day. He was a member of the Conference of Senior Circuit Judges (now the Judicial Conference of the United States) from 1931 to 1948, and was a member of the Judicial Conference of the United States from 1948 to 1957. Parker served as Chief Judge from 1948 until his death in 1958.

Unsuccessful Supreme Court nomination

On March 21, 1930, Parker was nominated by President Herbert Hoover as an Associate Justice of the United States Supreme Court to fill the vacancy caused by the death of Edward Terry Sanford. His confirmation was opposed by the American Federation of Labor (AFL) and National Association for the Advancement of Colored People (NAACP) during confirmation hearings before the Senate Judiciary Committee. AFL president William Green specifically faulted Parker for a 1926 Fourth Circuit Court decision which he authored regarding the United Mine Workers, involving antitrust law and yellow-dog contracts. The NAACP joined the opposition in response to remarks Parker had made while a candidate for governor in 1920 about the participation of African-Americans in the political process:
 

NAACP Acting Secretary Walter Francis White sent Parker a telegram asking Parker if he had been quoted correctly, and if he still held such views; Parker never replied. In response, the NAACP initiated a grassroots campaign against the nomination and White testified before the Judiciary Committee. On April 21, 1930, the committee voted 10–6 to forward the nomination to the full Senate with an adverse recommendation. Anticipating a close vote, White sent a telegram to Vice President Charles Curtis imploring him, if the vote ended in a tie, to cast his tie-breaking vote against confirmation. On May 7, 1930, the Senate rejected Parker's nomination by a 39–41 roll call vote. This was the first Supreme Court nomination rejected by the Senate since that of Wheeler Hazard Peckham in 1894. Two days later, President Hoover nominated Owen Roberts to fill the vacancy; Roberts was swiftly confirmed on May 20, 1930.

Later life and death

From 1945 to 1946, Parker served as an alternate judge on the International Allied Military Tribunal at Nuremberg, Germany. In 1954, he was elected to serve on the United Nations' International Law Commission.

Parker died on in Washington, D.C. on March 17, 1958, while still in active judicial service. He was buried in Elmwood Cemetery in Charlotte, North Carolina.

Legacy
The Judge John J. Parker Award is presented annually by the North Carolina Bar Association.

See also
Clement Haynsworth
G. Harrold Carswell

References

External links
 
 
 John Johnston Parker Papers, 1906-1987 (bulk 1920-1956), Southern Historical Collection, The Wilson Library, University of North Carolina at Chapel Hill.

|-

|-

1885 births
1958 deaths
20th-century American judges
International Law Commission officials
Judges of the United States Court of Appeals for the Fourth Circuit
North Carolina lawyers
North Carolina Republicans
People from Monroe, North Carolina
United States court of appeals judges appointed by Calvin Coolidge
University of North Carolina School of Law alumni
Unsuccessful nominees to the United States Supreme Court
American officials of the United Nations
Judges of the International Military Tribunal in Nuremberg
American judges of international courts and tribunals
Members of the International Law Commission